The ATP Challenger Tour, in 2018, was the secondary professional tennis circuit organized by the ATP. The 2018 ATP Challenger Tour calendar comprised 159 tournaments, with prize money ranging from $50,000 up to $150,000. It was the 41st edition of challenger tournaments cycle, and 10th under the name of Challenger Tour.

Schedule 
This was the complete schedule of events on the 2018 calendar, with player progression documented from the quarterfinals stage.

January

February

March

April

May

June

July

August

September

October

November

Statistical information 
These tables present the number of singles (S) and doubles (D) titles won by each player and each nation during the season. The players/nations are sorted by: 1) total number of titles (a doubles title won by two players representing the same nation counts as only one win for the nation); 2) a singles > doubles hierarchy; 3) alphabetical order (by family names for players).

Titles won by player

Titles won by nation

Point distribution 
Points are awarded as follows:

References

External links 
 Official website
 Calendar

 
ATP Challenger Tour
ATP Challenger Tour